Danny Leandro Aguilar Mancilla (born 25 February 1986) is a Colombian football striker who currently plays for Patriotas.

External links

 Deportivo Cali profile

1986 births
Living people
Sportspeople from Cauca Department
Colombian footballers
Categoría Primera A players
Deportivo Cali footballers
Atlético Huila footballers
Deportes Tolima footballers
Atlético Nacional footballers
Patriotas Boyacá footballers
Association football forwards